The  is an archaeological site containing the ruins of a large-scale Heian period josaku-style fortified settlement located in what is now part of the municipalities of Daisen and Misato in the Tōhoku region of Japan.  The site was designated a National Historic Site of Japan in 1931. The site is maintained  as an archaeological park with some reconstructed buildings.

Overview
In 1902, farmers discovered the remnants of a large wooden palisade in rice paddies near the border of Misato in Akita Prefecture. However, some fragments survived and were later dated by dendrochronology to the year 801 AD. Inscriptions of wooden artifacts found at the site mention Isawa Castle and Shiwa Castle which were created in the early ninth century AD; however, there is no mention of this huge fortification in any historical or literary records.

In the center of the enclosure was the ruins of an inner fortification, containing the pillar foundations for what appears to be an official administrative complex. The site appears to have been abandoned by the middle of the 10th century.

The site has been preserved as an archaeological park with some reconstructed buildings, and is located approximately 20 minutes by bus from the JR East Ōu Main Line Ōmagari Station.

Gallery

See also
List of Historic Sites of Japan (Akita)

References

External links

Akita Prefecture Official home page
Daisen City  city official site 

Heian period
Castles in Akita Prefecture
Ruined castles in Japan
History of Akita Prefecture
Daisen, Akita
Misato, Akita
Archaeological sites in Japan
Historic Sites of Japan
Dewa Province